"My Neck, My Back (Lick It)" is a song by American rapper Khia, released in April 2002 as the lead single from her debut studio album, Thug Misses. Owing to its sexually explicit lyrics, an edited version of the song was released to mainstream radio. The song reached number 42 on the US Billboard Hot 100. It also reached number four in the United Kingdom two years later and number 12 in Australia.

Background and meaning
The lyrics contain detailed, explicit descriptions of both cunnilingus and anilingus, so a heavily edited version was used for radio broadcasting and the official music video. Khia later stated in a 2002 interview for MTV News concerning the song's big success: "I guess the world is just nasty and freaky like that […] It's not even my favorite song, and I was kind of surprised that's the song that everybody jumped on. … That song is just nothing compared to my other music. It's like, 'That's what the world is about today,' so hey, it works for me."

In 2018, NPR ranked the song as #184 for their The 200 Greatest Songs By 21st Century Women list, saying: ""My Neck, My Back" is the most enduring erotic pleasure procedural of this era, and rightfully so. Underscoring the dirty in Dirty South, Khia raps simple demands as to where she wants to be licked (short version: "all over"), with explicit suggestions towards technique that span two dedicated verses. It's a delightfully nasty club classic where a woman's pleasure is presented as a debt owed her."

Recording and composition
"My Neck, My Back (Lick It)" is a dirty rap song, and India Mae Alby of Keakie.com described it as a "low beat Club song". The song is noted for its chorus, in which Khia raps "My neck, my back, lick my pussy and my crack". The song was written by Khia herself and Edward Meriwether. During a studio session, Khia recorded "My Neck, My Back" at Grooveland Studios in Clearwater, Florida.

Music video

Background
The music video was directed by Diane Martel, and was released during the spring of 2002. In the United Kingdom, a different video was used, which did not feature Khia, instead depicting a group of bikini-clad models washing a Hummer H2 in a seductive manner while lip-syncing the words to the song.

Synopsis
The music video begins with Khia dancing in a half-bikini dress at a party in front of various people full of arcade games. It later shows scenes of Khia at a pool receiving a massage by a dreadheaded man. Khia is also seen dancing at a barbecue. There are also scenes showing Khia in a house wearing a polka-dot shirt and heels surrounded by men. Khia can also be seen sitting on a bed in the same look she had on in the beginning of the video right next to many other various people.

Remixes and freestyles
The official remix of the song, the "Roc-A-Fella Remix", features rapper Memphis Bleek. The remix was released as a clean version.

Saweetie did a freestyle of the song titled "Icy Grl". The song was released on her SoundCloud in the summer of 2017 and later released a music video for it in October of the same year. The visual, which went viral on the Internet, would go on to accrue 104 million views on YouTube as of August 2020.

Usage in media
In 2015, American pop singer Miley Cyrus performed a cover of the song at the Adult Swim's New York City upfront party. The performance later caught the attention of Khia herself, who praised the singer-songwriter for performing the song.

American singer-songwriter Elle King covered the song in a country-like style.

The song is featured prominently and sampled in the Girl Talk song "Non-Stop Party Now" off the album Unstoppable.

Richard Cheese and Lounge Against the Machine did a lounge/swing styled cover of the song on their 2010 album OK Bartender.

Track listings
UK CD 1
"My Neck, My Back (Lick It)" (Clean Radio Edit) – 3:20
"My Neck, My Back (Lick It)" (Kardinal Beats Clean Radio Edit) – 3:02

UK CD 2
"My Neck, My Back (Lick It)" (Clean Radio Edit) – 3:20
"My Neck, My Back (Lick It)" (Kardinal Beats Clean Radio Edit) – 3:02
"My Neck, My Back (Lick It)" (Tom Neville X-Rated Mix) – 7:22
"My Neck, My Back (Lick It)" (FNP Remix) – 6:52
"My Neck, My Back (Lick It)" (Kardinal Beats Dirty Club Mix) – 3:24
"My Neck, My Back (Lick It)" (Street/Club Version) – 3:43
"My Neck, My Back (Lick It)" (Video)

UK 12-inch single
A1. "My Neck, My Back (Lick It)" (Kardinal Beats Dirty Club Mix) – 3:24
A2. "My Neck, My Back (Lick It)" (Friday Night Posse Remix) – 6:52
B1. "My Neck, My Back (Lick It)" (Street/Club Version) – 3:43
B2. "My Neck, My Back (Lick It)" (Tom Neville X-Rated Mix) – 7:22

Charts

Weekly charts

Year-end charts

Certifications

References

2002 songs
2002 debut singles
Dirty rap songs
Khia songs
Artemis Records singles
Music videos directed by Diane Martel